Canadian rock band Glass Tiger has released three studio albums, seven compilation albums, two EPs, two live albums, nineteen singles and six promotional singles.

Glass Tiger debuted in 1986 with The Thin Red Line, which contains hit songs like "Don't Forget Me (When I'm Gone)" and "Someday", both written by Jim Vallance, the band's music producer. In the same year, their first EP, titled Special Mini Album, was released only in Germany under the seal of Toshiba EMI Ltd. In 1988, they released Diamond Sun, which was less successful than the previous one. In 1991 they published Simple Mission, which contains the single "My Town", a song played with Rod Stewart. Later came Simple Vision, their first video album in VHS format.

In 1993, they released their first compilation album, Air Time: The Best of Glass Tiger, which contains a new single called "Touch of Your Hand", their last single so far. In 1999, Back to Back was published, half of its songs are by Glass Tiger and the other half by Paul Carrack. In 2001 they released Premium Gold Collection, a compilation with 17 songs released by EMI.

Celebrating 20 years of making music, in 2005 EMI released No Turning Back: 1985–2005, an album that includes new songs such as one by the same name, "No Turning Back". In 2006, their first live album, Glass Tiger: Live in Concert, came out, and then Extended Versions came out under the Sony / BMG label. In June 2012 they released The Thin Red Line (Anniversary Edition) is in honor of 25 years of the original release. Two months later, Then... Now... Next was released a compilation with new songs under the EMI record label.

Albums

Studio albums

Compilation albums

EPs

Live albums

Singles

Promotional singles

References

External links
 
 
 

Rock music group discographies
Discographies of Canadian artists